Esteban Orozco Fernández (born Esteban Obiang Obono, 7 May 1998), also known as Esteban Obiang or simply Esteban, is a professional footballer who plays as a defender for Romanian Liga I club AFC Chindia Târgoviște. Born in Spain, he represents the Equatorial Guinea national team.

Originally registered in the Spanish football competitions with his biological surnames (Obiang Obono), Orozco later replaced them with the ones from his Spanish adoptive parents (Orozco Fernández).

Early life
Esteban was born in Zaragoza. His biological mother died from complications during his birth. Then, his grandmother and his aunt took care of him. When he was only 22 months old, he was adopted by a Spanish family from Utrera, where he would spend most of his life. He considers himself as a person from Utrera.

Club career
Esteban made his senior debut with CD Utrera on 7 February 2016, in a 1–1 away tie against CD Alcalá. He finished that season having played a total of 7 Tercera División matches. Then, he moved to the youth team of Real Betis Balompié.

Esteban was renewed by Betis and promoted to its reserve team. He made his Segunda División B debut on 25 November 2017, in a 1–4 away win against FC Cartagena. On 25 January 2018, he returned to Utrera, loaned by Betis.

International career
Esteban made his international debut for Equatorial Guinea on 9 October 2017, in a 3–1 victory over Mauritius in a friendly match. He came on as a second-half substitute for Diosdado Mbele. On 16 January 2022, he help his national team to defeat Algeria during the 2021 Africa Cup of Nations by scoring the lone goal of the match.

Career statistics

International

International goals
Scores and results list Equatorial Guinea's goal tally first.

References

External links
 
 

1998 births
Living people
Citizens of Equatorial Guinea through descent
Equatoguinean footballers
Association football central defenders
Association football fullbacks
AFC Chindia Târgoviște players
Equatorial Guinea international footballers
2021 Africa Cup of Nations players
Equatoguinean expatriate footballers
Equatoguinean expatriate sportspeople in Romania
Expatriate footballers in Romania
Footballers from Zaragoza
Adoptees
People from Utrera
Sportspeople from the Province of Seville
Footballers from Andalusia
Spanish footballers
CD Utrera players
Betis Deportivo Balompié footballers
CF Sant Rafel players
UD Ibiza players
Antequera CF footballers
Tercera División players
Segunda División B players
Segunda Federación players
Liga I players
Spanish expatriate footballers
Spanish expatriate sportspeople in Romania
Spanish sportspeople of Equatoguinean descent